A flexible seating classroom is one in which traditional seating charts are replaced with seating arrangements that allow the students to sit where they choose. One of its principal objectives is to reduce the number/duration of sedentary periods of time, which research has identified as a danger to health. The Albemarle County Public School system in Virginia adopted this approach with reported success and studied and taken into consideration also in Europe: more in details, a Flexible seating classrooms could improved an inclusive education.

Health impacts 
Studies have found that extended sitting affects the development of the musculoskeletal system, leading to health disorders such as cardiovascular problems, poor posture, back pain and neck pain.

According to Dieter Breithecker at Germany's Federal Institute for Posture and Mobilization Support, brain activity slows down when the body becomes stationary, for example when sitting in a traditional classroom. Breithecker recommended flexible seating arrangements to remedy these dangers.

Flexible seating classroom designs include:
stools
couches
beanbag chairs
chairs
beds
mats
inflatable balls
standing
laying on the floor
pillows
benches
hanging chairs

References

 Todino M.D., Aiello P., Sibilio M. (2016). FLEXIBLE CLASSROOMS FOR INCLUSIVE EDUCATION. In: Proceedings of ICERI2016 Conference 14th16th November 2016, Seville, Spain. p. 1674-1678, Seville, Spain, 14th-16th November 2016 https://library.iated.org/view/TODINO2016FLE

Education theory